Jamie William Hoyland (born 23 January 1966) is an English former footballer who made more than 400 appearances in the Football League and Premier League playing in midfield in the 1980s and 1990s. He then turned to coaching. He was assistant manager at Rochdale in 2002 and more recently academy manager at Sheffield United.
His father Tommy Hoyland had also played for Sheffield United from 1949 to 1961.

Playing career
Hoyland was born in Sheffield. He began his playing career at Manchester City as a midfielder and later left to Bury FC. After making over a hundred appearance for the club, he left for Sheffield United. At his last year at Sheffield, he was sent on loan to Bristol City.

Coaching career
He was appointed assistant manager at Rochdale in 2002. and has held youth coaching positions at Bolton Wanderers and Preston North End. In September 2012, Hoyland was appointed manager of Sheffield United F.C. Academy. However, on 19 March 2013 he resigned as academy manager.

References

External links

1966 births
Living people
Footballers from Sheffield
Association football midfielders
English footballers
Manchester City F.C. players
Bury F.C. players
Sheffield United F.C. players
Bristol City F.C. players
Burnley F.C. players
Carlisle United F.C. players
Scarborough F.C. players
English Football League players
Premier League players
Bolton Wanderers F.C. non-playing staff
Sheffield United F.C. non-playing staff